Stella Baker (born 1993) is an American actress, best known for her roles in The Republic of Sarah and Tell Me Your Secrets.

Early life and career 
She was born in Australia to actors Simon Baker and Rebecca Rigg, and grew up in Los Angeles, California. Her first acting role was in a play in her early 20s. She moved to Portland for college and attended the Yale School of Drama, graduating in 2018.

She first appeared as a guest in the second episode of the final 2014 season of her father's show The Mentalist, "The Greybar Hotel". Subsequently, she appeared in a number of shorts, one of which she also wrote and produced, before being cast in the thriller drama series Tell Me Your Secrets as Theresa Barlow.

She played Sarah Cooper in The CW's The Republic of Sarah for its only season in 2021.

Awards and nominations

References

External links
 

Living people
1993 births
20th-century American actresses
21st-century American actresses
Actresses from Los Angeles
American people of Australian descent
American television actresses